Hollywood Speaks is a 1932 American Pre-Code comedy film.

Cast
Genevieve Tobin as Gertrude Smith, later known as Greta Swan
Pat O'Brien as Jimmy Reed
Lucien Prival as Frederick Landau
Ralf Harolde as Carp
Rita La Roy as Millie Coreen
Leni Stengel as Mrs. Landau
Anderson Lawlor as Joe Hammond
Jack Holt as himself

Production
Columbia announced the film in August 1931.

It was Norman Krasna's first film under his contract with Columbia and he started writing it in April 1932. The same amount the studio announced Eddie Buzzel would direct and Genevieve Tobin would star.

Reception
The Los Angeles Times called it a "routine melodrama with little to say of interest."

References

External links
Hollywood Speaks at IMDb
Hollywood Speaks at TCMDB
Review of film at Variety

1932 comedy films
American comedy films
American black-and-white films
1932 films
Columbia Pictures films
1930s American films